The Survivor is a 2016 Pakistani-American documentary short written and directed by Danial Afzal, of Arash Visuals, Inc, and produced by Shazia Sikandar and Kruti Mehta. The film follows the story of a boy named Muneeb who survived the Army Public School Massacre of 2014 in Peshawar, Pakistan.

Synopsis 
The story follows Muhammad Muneeb Khan, who lost his brother, Shaheer, in a tragic incident that occurred in Peshawar, Pakistan on 16 December 2014. The Taliban attacked the Army Public School and killed over 130 children. This film is a look into the mind of Muneeb, who still suffers from Post-Traumatic Stress Disorder (PTSD) while attempting to find his purpose. The film's story is presented in the format of a personal statement for a college application. It also interviews his family members and Mowadat Rana, a psychiatrist and professor, who discusses the struggles of PTSD.

Screenings 
The Survivor premiered in 2016 in Lahore, Pakistan. During 2017, it was entered into the 16th IWM Short Film Festival in London, and the Ismailia International Film Festival in Cairo, Egypt. In 2018, The Survivor was screened at the 11th International Children's Rights Film Festival in Dhaka, Bangladesh, and the 1st Pakistan International Film Festival in Karachi.

Reception 
Mehr Sher of The Nation was moved to tears at the screening, and found the film to be a "must-watch film for all those that have a conscience". Kruti Mehta of The News International wrote that the music made the documentary relatable to viewers, and thought that the director and producer effectively used the film as an actual personal statement to promote Muneeb Khan to get scholarships and funding for college.

Awards

Home media 
This film was released to the iflix streaming service in September 2018.

Gallery

References

External links 
 
 

Pakistani short documentary films
Indian Army Public Schools
Taliban